Kraco Enterprises, LLC, is an American private company. It primarily manufactures fabricated rubber products for a wide variety of purposes and applications. While they mainly produce floormats, they have also been a supplier for the automotive industry producing tire walls and even audio equipment including car speakers, stereos, and CB radios. Kraco was founded in 1954 in Compton, California.  Their first product was "Snap-on" white walls to create temporary white-walled tires. They moved into making rubber, vinyl and soon thereafter, carpet floormats as the business expanded.

During the 1980s and 1990s, Kraco sponsored Indy Car racing with drivers Michael Andretti, Bobby Rahal and Al Unser Jr., winning the Indianapolis 500 in 1992.

Sun Capital Partners, an American investment firm, acquired Kraco in August 2008.   In 2010, Kraco Enterprises purchased Auto Expressions, a provider of automobile accessories, which resulted in Kraco tripling its revenue.

In the U.K., Kraco products are distributed by its subsidiary Kraco Car Care International Limited (Shell Car Care International Limited until October 1, 2010), which also inherited the distribution of Rain-X products in the U.K.

On October 21, 2015, Kraco Enterprises has acquired Who-Rae, a manufacturer and distributor of automotive aftermarket accessories.

Race Results

PPG CART Indycar World Series
(key)

IndyCar wins

 Note: this does not include wins achieved in 1990, 1991 and 1992 as Galles-Kraco Racing.

References

Company overview Yahoo Finance

External links
Official Kraco Products website
Corporate history on the official Kraco Enterprises website

Auto parts suppliers of the United States
Manufacturing companies based in California
Companies based in Los Angeles County, California
Compton, California
Manufacturing companies established in 1954
1954 establishments in California